István Pásztor (born 5 June 1971 in Cegléd) is a Hungarian handball player.

Career

Club
From 1993 to 2008 he played for KC Veszprém, one of the most successful Hungarian clubs. During this spell, he has won twelve Hungarian Championship and eleven Hungarian Cup titles. He also appeared in three continental cup finals. After failed against CD Bidasoa in the EHF Cup Winners' Cup finals in 1997, and lost on a three goals aggregate difference against SC Magdeburg in the EHF Champions League five years later, he finally crowned his career in Veszprém with an EHF Cup Winners' Cup triumph in 2008. Few months later, in the summer of 2008 he moved to Balatonfüredi KSE.

International
He is a former Hungarian international, who has been capped 215 times. He participated on three World Championships (1993, 1997, 2003) and four European Championships (1994, 1996, 1998, 2004). He also competed at the 2004 Summer Olympics, where the Hungarian team placed fourth.

He played for the World Selection in 2005 against Russia, and helped the team of international stars with four goals to win the match to 37–33. His national team mate János Szathmári also played for the team, that was coached by Sead Hasanefendić and Péter Kovács.

Motorcycle accident
On 29 September 2010, when riding on his Ducati motorcycle to the city center, Pásztor hit a pedestrian on a street crossing. He fell over, but suffered only minor injuries. The 80-year-old man who was hit, died on the spot. Pásztor was initially sentenced by the court to eight months in prison and to pay a fine of 334,397 Hungarian Forint (approximately 1,250 Euro). However, he appealed the decision, and on 20 January 2011 the sentence was repealed.

Nevertheless, the appellate court later upheld the verdict on 28 November 2011 and beside imprisonment, Pásztor was banned from driving for five years and obligated to pay the court costs. Pásztor admitted his guilt in court and expressed his determination to look after the deceased man's widow.

Achievements
Nemzeti Bajnokság I:
Winner: 1994, 1995, 1997, 1998, 1999, 2001, 2002, 2003, 2004, 2005, 2006, 2008
Magyar Kupa:
Winner:  1994, 1995, 1996, 1998, 1999, 2000, 2002, 2003, 2004, 2005, 2007
EHF Champions League:
Finalist: 2002
EHF Cup Winners' Cup:
Winner: 2008
Finalist: 1997
EHF Champions Trophy:
 Finalist: 2002, 2008

Individual awards
 Hungarian Handballer of the Year: 1996, 1999, 2001

References

1971 births
Living people
People from Cegléd
Hungarian male handball players
Olympic handball players of Hungary
Handball players at the 2004 Summer Olympics
Hungarian prisoners and detainees
Sportspeople from Pest County